The 1968 UCI Road World Championships took place from 31 August-1 September 1968 in Imola, Italy (for professionals), on a 75 km circuit starting and arriving at the "Enzo and Dino Ferrari" auto racing circuit.  The amateur races were held from 7-10 November in Montevideo, Uruguay.

Results

Medal table

References

External links 

 Men's results
 Women's results
  Results at sportpro.it

 
UCI Road World Championships by year
UCI Road World Championships 1968
UCI Road World Championships 1968
Uci Road World Championships, 1968
1968 in road cycling